The Ambassador of the United Kingdom to the Republic of Yemen is the United Kingdom's foremost diplomatic representative in Yemen, and head of the UK's diplomatic mission in Sana'a.

Operations at the British Embassy in Sana'a were temporarily suspended on 11 February 2015 due to the deteriorating security situation which preceded the Yemeni Civil War. The ambassador and his team are currently based in Saudi Arabia and Jordan.

Ambassadors

Ambassadors to the People's Democratic Republic of Yemen (South Yemen)
1970–1972: Arthur Kellas
1972–1975: Granville Ramage
1975–1983: No ambassador various Chargé d'Affaires:
 1979–1980: Colin Dyer 
1983–1985: Peter Keegan Williams
1986–1989: Arthur Marshall
1989–1990: Douglas Gordon

Ambassadors to the Yemen Arab Republic (North Yemen)
1971–1973: Michael Edes
1973–1976: Derrick Carden
1977–1978: Benjamin Strachan
1979–1984: Julian Walker
1984–1987: David Tatham
1987–1990: Mark Marshall

Ambassadors to the Republic of Yemen
1990–1993: Mark Marshall
1993–1995: Douglas Gordon
1995–1997: Douglas Scrafton
1997–2001: Victor Henderson
2001–2004: Frances Guy
2004–2007: Michael Gifford
2007–2010: Timothy Torlot
2010–2011: Jonathan Wilks
2012–2013: Nicholas Hopton
2013–2015: Jane Marriott
2015–2017: Edmund Fitton-Brown
2017–2018: Simon Shercliff

2018–2021: Michael Aron
2021–present: Richard Oppenheim

References

External links
UK and Yemen, gov.uk

Yemen
 
United Kingdom